Lincoln Middle School may refer to:

Canada
 Lincoln Middle School (Winnipeg, Manitoba); see Robert Browning School

United States
 Lincoln Middle School (Alameda, California)
 Lincoln Middle School (Santa Monica, California)
 Lincoln Middle School (Fort Collins, Colorado)
 Lincoln Middle School (Gainesville, Florida)
 Lincoln Middle School (La Salle, Illinois), LaSalle Elementary School District 122
 Lincoln Middle School (Mount Prospect, Illinois), Mount Prospect, Illinois
 Lincoln Middle School (Park Ridge, Illinois)
 Lincoln Middle School (Rockford, Illinois), a public school in Rockford, Illinois
 
 Lincoln Middle School (Indianapolis, Indiana), Metropolitan School District of Pike Township
 Lincoln Middle School (Portland, Maine)
 Lincoln Middle School (Dunellen, New Jersey), Dunellen Public Schools
 Lincoln Middle School (El Paso, Texas)
 Lincoln Middle School (Pullman, Washington)
 Lincoln Middle School (Washington, D.C.)

See also
 Lincoln School (disambiguation)
 Lincoln Elementary School (disambiguation)
 Lincoln High School (disambiguation)